The Macedonian First Football League (Prva Мakedonska Fudbalska Liga), also called Macedonian First League, 1. MFL, and Prva Liga, is the highest professional football competition in North Macedonia. It is a professional league competition for football clubs located at the top of the Macedonian football league system and has been operating since the 1992–93 season. It is organized by the Football Federation of North Macedonia.

Format

Throughout the 1. MFL history, the number of clubs competing at the top level has been gradually decreased until the 2020–21 season. Below is a complete record of how many teams played in each season throughout the league's history:

The league has 12 teams, and each team plays the other sides three times, for a total of 33 matches each.

Due to the UEFA ranking coefficients ranking (shown below), the winners of the league enter the 1st qualifying round of the Champions League, while the second and third placed teams enter the 1st qualifying round of the UEFA Europa Conference League alongside the winner of the Macedonian Football Cup. At the end of the season, the bottom 2 teams are relegated to the Macedonian Second League while the eighth placed team enter a play-off with the winner of the tie between second placed teams of the two groups in the Macedonian Second League.

UEFA rankings
UEFA country ranking for league participation in 2021–22 European football season (Previous year rank in italics)

 52  (52)  Besta-deild karla
 53  (48)  Macedonian First League
 54  (53)  Montenegrin First League
 55  (55)  Campionato Sammarinese di Calcio

Current teams (2022–23)

History
In 1923 the first national Yugoslav Football Championship was held, and regional championships were also played.  The clubs of the Vardar Banovina, territorially similar to present day Macedonia, played within the Belgrade Football Subassociation league until 1927, when a separate Skoplje Football Subassociation league was formed. The champions of the subassociation leagues were granted a place in the qualifiers to the Yugoslav Championship. Gragjanski Skopje became the only Macedonian club to participate in the national league, first in 1935–36 when the championship was played in a cup format, and then in 1938–39, when it was played in a normal league system with Gragjanski finishing 10th out of 12 teams. In 1939 the Yugoslav league system was changed, with the creation of separate Serbian and Croato-Slovenian leagues which served as qualifying leagues for the final phase of the Yugoslav Championship. The clubs from the Skopje Subassociation aimed to qualify to the Serbian League, however only Gragjanski managed to participate, in 1939–40 (5th place) and 1940–41 (8th place).

Current Champion
The current champion of the Macedonian First League is Shkupi.

List of seasons

Most titles

The titles won by clubs since independence are shown in the following table:

References

External links
Macedonian First League current season standings and recent results at Uefa.com
Tables of the previous seasons at MacedonianFootball.com
Football Federation of Macedonia 
1.MFL on instagram 

 
Sports leagues established in 1992
1992 establishments in the Republic of Macedonia
1
Macedonia